The Zytek 2ZG408 engine is a 4.0-litre, normally-aspirated, DOHC, V8 racing engine, developed and produced by Zytek for sports car racing, between 2006 and 2007.

Applications
Zytek 06S
Zytek 07S

References

Engines by model
Gasoline engines by model
Zytek engines
V8 engines